The 2016–17 season of the Swiss 1. Liga was the 95th season of the fourth tier of the Swiss football league system.

Tables

Group 1

Group 2

Group 3

Promotion play-offs

Yverdon Sport FC and FC Stade Lausanne-Ouchy were promoted to the 2017–18 Swiss Promotion League.

References

External links 
  

Swiss 1. Liga Classic
4